Horitschon is a town in the district of Oberpullendorf in the Austrian state of Burgenland. One of five Hungarian consulates at Austria is placed here.

Population

References

Cities and towns in Oberpullendorf District